L-Seven was an American post-punk band from Detroit, Michigan, United States. The band existed during 1980–1983. Some band members had been formerly active in Detroit punk bands The Blind, Algebra Mothers, and Retro. Anecdotally, they lifted their name from the Rick James album Bustin' Out of L Seven. In February 1982, they recorded a self-titled three-song EP at Multi Trac Studios in Redford, Michigan. The EP was released as a 7" titled "L-Seven" by Touch and Go Special Forces in 1982. Although Touch and Go Special Forces was created to issue records of a different nature than the hardcore records that Touch and Go was issuing at the time, L-Seven's record was the only release under the "Special Forces" imprint.
During their brief existence, L-Seven supported many well-known post-punk bands such as The Gun Club, Killing Joke, The Stranglers, Iggy Pop, Bauhaus, U2, and The Birthday Party.

The last of these was one of the inspirations for the Laughing Hyenas, the band Singer Larissa Stolarchuk (under the nom de plume Larissa Strickland) went on to form with former Negative Approach singer John Brannon. In the Hyenas, she switched to playing guitar, relinquishing vocal duties to Brannon.

Stolarchuk died on October 9, 2006. Drummer Kory Clarke fronts the long-running band Warrior Soul. Guitarist Dave Rice would go on to form the bands The Linkletters and Sandy Duncan's Eye and at one point auditioned for British post punk band Public Image Limited.  In 2020, with the involvement of Sonic Youth drummer and Michigan native Steve Shelley, a long time fan of the band, Third Man Records released a compilation of unreleased L-Seven Demos and live recordings, which includes live renditions of the Misfits song "London Dungeon" and the Alice Cooper song "You Drive Me Nervous". The website Detroit Punk Archive has a compiled an oral history of the band.

Discography

References

External links
 "L-Seven" at the "Touch and Go Records" website
 Corey Rusk notes the death of Larissa Stolarchuk

American pop music groups
Musical groups from Detroit
Touch and Go Records artists
Musical groups established in 1980
Musical groups disestablished in 1983
1980 establishments in Michigan